

Z

Z